The Yugra Cup was a professional tennis tournament played on indoor carpet courts. It was part of the Association of Tennis Professionals (ATP) Challenger Tour and the International Tennis Federation (ITF) Women's Circuit. It was held in Khanty-Mansiysk, Russia, in 2009 and 2010. The men's edition was held in December, whilst the women's edition was held in March.

Past finals

Men's singles

Women's singles

Men's doubles

Women's doubles

External links
ITF search

 
ATP Challenger Tour
ITF Women's World Tennis Tour
Carpet court tennis tournaments
Recurring sporting events established in 2009
Recurring sporting events disestablished in 2010
Tennis tournaments in Russia
Sport in Khanty-Mansiysk
Defunct sports competitions in Russia
2009 establishments in Russia
2010 disestablishments in Russia